Dame Carolyn Emma Kirkby,  (born 26 February 1949) is an English soprano and early music specialist. She has sung on over 100 recordings.

Education and early career 
Kirkby was educated at Hanford School, Sherborne School for Girls in Dorset, and Somerville College, Oxford University. Her father was Geoffrey John Kirkby, a Royal Navy Officer.

Kirkby did not originally intend to become a professional singer. In the late 1960s, while she was studying classics at Oxford, she joined the Schola Cantorum of Oxford, a student choir which, at the time, was being conducted by Andrew Parrott. After graduation, Kirkby went to work as a school teacher, but became increasingly involved in singing with the growing number of music ensembles that were being founded during the Early music revival of the early 1970s. She married Parrott, and sang with his Taverner Choir which he founded in 1973. Her vocal career developed throughout the 1970s, and she became noted as a soloist in performances and recordings with prominent early music performers, including Anthony Rooley and the Consort of Musicke and Christopher Hogwood's Academy of Ancient Music.

She taught for many years at Dartington International Summer School, the Guildhall School of Music & Drama, as well as the Bel Canto Summer School.

Recordings 

Kirkby has made over 100 recordings, including madrigals of the Italian and English Renaissance, cantatas and oratorios of the Baroque, works of Mozart, Haydn and Johann Christian Bach. Some of her most noted recordings have included a 1981 recording with the Gothic Voices of sequences of Hildegard of Bingen's A Feather on the Breath of God; the Taverner Consort's 1984 recordings of Monteverdi's Selva Morale e Spirituale and Bach's Mass in B minor; and her 1980 recording of Handel's Messiah conducted by Christopher Hogwood, which brought her international acclaim.  The Messiah recording was later named one of the top 20 recordings of all time by BBC Music Magazine.

Other recordings include Handel Opera Arias and Overtures 2 for Hyperion, Bach wedding cantatas for Decca, Bach Cantatas 82a and 199 for Carus; and four projects for BIS: with London Baroque, one of Handel motets and one of Christmas music by Scarlatti, Bach and others; with the Royal Academy Baroque Orchestra the first recording of the newly rediscovered Gloria by Handel; and with the Romantic Chamber Group of London, Chanson d'amour, an album of songs by the American composer Amy Beach.

In the 2000s, she recorded an anthology, Classical Kirkby, devised and performed with Anthony Rooley, on the BIS label, 2002; Cantatas by Cataldo Amodei, also for BIS, 2004; with Fretwork, consort songs by William Byrd, for Harmonia Mundi USA, 2005.; Scarlatti Stabat Mater with Daniel Taylor, for ATMA, 2006; Honey from the Hive, songs of John Dowland, with Anthony Rooley, for BIS, 2006: and Musique and Sweet Poetrie, also for BIS, 2007; lute songs from Europe with Jakob Lindberg.

Selected discography 
Kirkby's recordings include:
 Messiah, A Sacred Oratorio (Foundling Hospital Version 1754), with the Academy of Ancient Music (L'Oiseau-Lyre, 1980)
 A Feather on the Breath of God; with the Gothic Voices (Hyperion Records, 1984)
 Monteverdi – Vespro della Beata Vergine 1610, with the Taverner Consort and Players (EMI Reflexe, 1983)
 Claudio Monteverdi — Selva Morale e Spirituale, with the Taverner Consort and Players (EMI Reflexe, 1984)
 J S Bach – Mass in B minor, with the Taverner Consort and Players (EMI Reflexe, 1985)
 Handel,— Opera Arias (Hyperion Records, 1996)
 Bach: Wedding Cantatas, Christopher Hogwood, The Academy of Ancient Music, Decca 1996
 Handel — Sacred Cantatas  (BIS Records, 2001)
 Chanson d´amour — Songs and instrumental works  (BIS Records, 2002)
 Byrd – Consort Songs, with Fretwork  (Harmonia Mundi, 2004)
 Alessandro Scarlatti — Stabat Mater, with the Theatre of Early Music (Atma Classique, 2005)
 Classical Kirkby — 17th Century English Songs on classical themes (BIS Records)
 Cataldo Amodei — Cantatas (BIS Records)
 Musique and Sweet Poetrie — Jewels from Europe around 1600, with Jakob Lindberg (BIS Records)
 Honey from the Hive — Songs by John Dowland (1563–1626) (BIS Records)
 In Nativitate Domini — Festive Christmas Music; with Susanne Rydén and Bell'Arte Salzburg (Berlin Classics)
 Handel in Italy — Solo Cantatas; with London Baroque (BIS Records, 2008)

Honours 
In 1994, Kirkby was awarded an Honorary Degree (Doctor of Music) from the University of Bath. In 1999 she was voted 'Artist of the Year' by Classic FM Radio listeners and in November 2000 she received the Order of the British Empire. BBC Music Magazine in April 2007 published a survey of critics to nominate "The 20 greatest sopranos", placing Kirkby at number 10.

She was appointed a Dame Commander of the Order of the British Empire in the 2007 Queen's Birthday Honours List. In 2010 she became President of Dartington Community Choir. On 21 January 2011 it was announced that Kirkby had been awarded the Queen's Medal for Music, an award funded by the Privy Purse and given to an individual who has had a major influence on the musical life of the nation.

In 2018, Kirkby was awarded the REMA Early Music Award in recognition of her career as an artist and mentor to young Early Music performers.  In 2019, she was awarded the Lifetime Achievement Award at the Gramophone Classical Music Awards ceremony.

Personal life 
From 1971 to 1983, Kirkby was married to conductor Andrew Parrott. Later, lutenist Anthony Rooley, with whom she had a child, become Kirkby’s long-term partner. On 30 April 2015 she married conductor Howard Williams.

Kirkby is a Co-President of the opera company Hampstead Garden Opera.

References

External links 

 
 BIS records – artist's page
 Harmonia Mundi records – artist's page
 Hyperion records – artist's page
 ATMA records – artist's page
 Decca records – artist's page
 Goldberg, the early-music portal
 

1949 births
Living people
British sopranos
English classical singers
British performers of early music
Women performers of early music
Alumni of Somerville College, Oxford
People educated at Hanford School
People educated at Sherborne Girls
Honorary Members of the Royal Academy of Music
Dames Commander of the Order of the British Empire
Singers awarded knighthoods
Handel Prize winners
Fellows of Somerville College, Oxford
20th-century English women singers
20th-century English singers
21st-century English women singers
21st-century English singers
Presidents of the Classical Association